Paul A. Chamberlain is a United States Army lieutenant general who is the Military Deputy for Budget to the Assistant Secretary of the Army (Financial Management and Comptroller) since August 3, 2021. He most recently served as Director for Army Budget of the United States Army from August 3, 2017 to August 2021. Previously, he served as the Deputy Chief of Staff for Programs and Director of Resource Management of the United States Army Central.

In June 2021, he was nominated and confirmed for promotion to lieutenant general and assignment as the next Military Deputy for Budget to the Assistant Secretary of the Army (Financial Management and Comptroller), succeeding the retiring Thomas Horlander. He was promoted to his present rank on August 2, 2021.

References

External links
 

Year of birth missing (living people)
Living people
Place of birth missing (living people)
United States Army generals